Baxter B. Stiles (June 26, 1824 - September 30, 1889) was an American politician.  He served as mayor of Denver, Colorado from 1869 to 1871, and again from 1877 to 1878. Born in Newbury, Vermont, he died in Denver, and is buried in that city's Riverside Cemetery.

References

Mayors of Denver
People from Newbury, Vermont
1824 births
1878 deaths
19th-century American politicians